The men's omnium competition at the 2019  UEC European Track Championships was held on 18 October 2019.

Results

Scratch race

Tempo race

Elimination race

Points race and final standings
The final ranking is given by the sum of the points obtained in the 4 specialties.

References

Men's omnium
European Track Championships – Men's omnium